Harry Nicholls VC (21 April 1915 – 11 September 1975) was an English recipient of the Victoria Cross, the highest and most prestigious award for gallantry in the face of the enemy that can be awarded to British and Commonwealth forces.

Military career
He was born on 21 April 1915 and was 25 years old, and a lance-corporal in the 3rd Battalion, Grenadier Guards, British Army during the Second World War when the following deed took place during the Battle of France for which he was awarded the VC.

On 21 May 1940 near the River Escaut, in the village of Esquelmes north of Tournai for 6 km in Belgium, Lance-Corporal Nicholls, although suffering from shrapnel wounds in his arm, continued to lead his section in a counter-attack against overwhelming opposition. He advanced over a ridge and when the position became critical, he rushed forward, putting three enemy machine-guns out of action. He then attacked massed enemy infantry beyond a second ridge until his ammunition ran out and he was taken prisoner.

Victoria Cross citation

The announcement and accompanying citation for the decoration was published in supplement to the London Gazette on 31 July 1940, reading

Contrary to his citation, Nicholls was taken as a prisoner of war. He was presented with his VC ribbon by a German commandant when he was a prisoner in Poland.

Legacy
His Victoria Cross is displayed at The Guards Regimental Headquarters (Grenadier Guards RHQ), Wellington Barracks in London.

References

British VCs of World War 2 (John Laffin, 1997)
Guards VC: Blitzkrieg 1940 (Dilip Sarkar, 1999)
Monuments to Courage (David Harvey, 1999)
The Register of the Victoria Cross (This England, 1997)

External links
Lance Corporal H. Nicholls in The Art of War exhibition at the UK National Archives
Location of grave and VC medal (Nottinghamshire)

1915 births
1975 deaths
Grenadier Guards soldiers
British Army personnel of World War II
World War II prisoners of war held by Germany
British World War II recipients of the Victoria Cross
British World War II prisoners of war
British Army recipients of the Victoria Cross
Military personnel from Nottingham